Sivaneh may refer to:
 Sivaneh Seh Tian